The 919th Aircraft Control and Warning Squadron is an inactive United States Air Force unit. It was last assigned to the Spokane Air Defense Sector, Air Defense Command, stationed at Saskatoon Mountain Air Station, Alberta, Canada. It was inactivated on 1 April 1963.

The unit was a General Surveillance Radar squadron providing for the air defense of North America.

Lineage
 Activated as 919th Aircraft Control and Warning Squadron, 16 April 1952
 Discontinued 1 April 1963

Assignments
 Western Air Defense Force, 16 April 1952
 25th Air Division, 16 February 1953 – 1 April 1963

Stations
 Geiger Field, Washington, 16 April 1952
 Saskatoon Mountain AS, Alberta, 1 June 1953 – 1 April 1963

References

  A Handbook of Aerospace Defense Organization 1946 - 1980,  by Lloyd H. Cornett and Mildred W. Johnson, Office of History, Aerospace Defense Center, Peterson Air Force Base, Colorado

External links

Radar squadrons of the United States Air Force
Aerospace Defense Command units